The Men's team large hill competition at the FIS Nordic World Ski Championships 2023 was held on 4 March 2023.

Results
The first round was started at 16:30 and the final round at 17:35.

References

Men's team large hill